Skarżyn may refer to:

Skarżyn, Łódź Voivodeship (central Poland)
Skarżyn, Ostrołęka County in Masovian Voivodeship (east-central Poland)
Skarżyn, Siedlce County in Masovian Voivodeship (east-central Poland)
Skarżyn, Węgrów County in Masovian Voivodeship (east-central Poland)
Skarżyn, Greater Poland Voivodeship (west-central Poland)
Skarżyn, Warmian-Masurian Voivodeship (north Poland)

See also
Nowy Skarżyn, Poland (literally "New Skarzyn")
Stary Skarżyn, Poland (literally "Old Skarzyn")